Defense Update is an online defense magazine published by Lance & Shield Ltd. from Israel.

History
Defense Update was established in 1978 as a printed magazine, founded by IDF Retired LtCol. David Eshel. (דוד אשל) It was the first international defense publication published from Israel, and the first privately operated defense magazine published in Israel.

Initially it was known as Born in Battle, commemorating Israel's 30th Anniversary.  It was first published in six editions, themed after Israel Defense Forces (IDF) 30th anniversary, Israel Air Force's 30th anniversary, the Yom Kippur War, Israel's Armor Corps, Israel's infantry and special forces and the Six-Day War. Over 200,000 copies of these English titles were published, in several versions, as soft and hard cover books, and magazines. They were also translated into German, Spanish and French editions.

Following the launch of the book series, Born in Battle expanded its coverage to include general military topics, military history, strategy and techniques. To reflect these changes, the magazine changed its name to Defense Update International.

Over the next 12 years 99 issues of Defense Update were published, distributed worldwide, written, edited and managed by a small team of Israeli veterans. At the peak of its success, during the late eighties, Defense Update was published simultaneously in four languages (English, German, French and Hebrew).

Defense Update ceased publication in the early 1990s. Its Hebrew predecessor 'Romach' (רומח) continued publication for several years.

Defense Update'''s publisher Lance & Shield embarked on a new concept, supporting Israel's defense export activities with a dedicated magazine, highlighting Israel's defense technology programs. The magazine called Defense Review International was published periodically in support of major airshows and defense exhibitions. The editor was Tamir Eshel, (תמיר אשל) David's son and the assistant editor in charge of the production of Defense Update publications.

By the year 1994 Defense Review International was transformed from a print publication into a CD-ROM-based directory style publication, employing a groundbreaking hyperlink editing technology, developed by Israel's hypertext pioneer Enigma. A year later, the new digital and interactive defense directory transformed into an online publication.

Lacking  local industry understanding and acceptance of the new initiative, the publication could not muster enough support to sustain the publication. Moreover, the host service provider went bust, practically erasing the young website from the web around 1997.

Five years later, Defense Update returned - now focusing on advanced defense technology, with special focus on Israel's defense topics. By 2002 Defense Update published the first edition which was irregularly updated until January 2004, when the new online venture once more assumed the brand and tradition of the former magazine. In 2009 Noam Eshel (נועם אשל) joined the editorial team as photographer and news editor. In his role as assistant editor for technology Noam was responsible for several phases of upgrading the pioneer defense-update into a modern website.

As of March 2012 it serves 220,000 unique users per month, reaching over two million readers on an annual basis. Defense Update covers worldwide topics, highlighting strategy, defense technology and military affairs related to Israel, Israel's defense industries, Global War on Terror and global military power.

CoverageDefense Update'' coverage spans land, air, naval, C4ISR, intelligence, and network-centric warfare, infantry warfighting tactics and techniques, homeland defense etc. Defense Update covers Armoured Fighting Vehicles (AFV), Future Combat Systems, Aerospace - and unmanned systems, as well as robotics and Precision Strike weapons. Analysis of trends in Command, Control, Communications and Computing, Intelligence, Surveillance and Reconnaissance (C4ISR) is included.

The site focuses on trends such as hybrid and asymmetric warfare, and network-centric operations, force protection and homeland security. Defense Update and its authors are referenced by defense establishments and publications, including the British Ministry of Defense , U.S. Army 

The site maintains a defense forum on Linkedin, and an interest group on Facebook, distributes instant updates on Twitter, and supports media channels on Flickr and YouTube, featuring photos and videos. The site is designed to enable effective use of mobile phones.

References

Defense-Update content index on Aeroflight
 World's Best Armor Websites/ Israel's Armored Corps Association Website - Yad Lashiryon

External links
Defense Update website
David Eshel Merkava article, Armor Magazine

Magazines published in Israel
Magazines established in 1978
Military magazines
Online magazines with defunct print editions